Pierce College is a public community college in Pierce County, Washington. The college consists of two main campuses, Pierce College Fort Steilacoom in Lakewood and Pierce College Puyallup in Puyallup, and auxiliary campuses at Fort Lewis, McChord Air Force Base, and in South Hill. The college is home to 17,707 students.

History

In 1967, Clover Park Community College opened its administrative offices and library in an abandoned grocery store on Bridgeport Way Southwest, now the site of QFC. It was nicknamed Albertsons' U.  Classes were held, however, at various Pierce County locations such as high schools, military bases, and hospitals.

Later that year, on March 24, the Washington State Legislature passed the Community College Act. This law shifted the control of community colleges from the school districts to the state. On April 3, Governor Dan Evans signed the bill into law.

Consequently, the site of the new campus was chosen on a  site in Fort Steilacoom.  By 1970, the college changed its name to Fort Steilacoom Community College. Until the opening of the main building in 1974, classes were taught in portables.

In the 1980s, the college opened the Fort Steilacoom Community College Eastern Extension at the corner of 94th Avenue and 112th Street/39th Avenue in Puyallup, Washington. This building has since become the home of Gateway Realty.

As a result of increasing enrollment over the years, the college sought a name that encompasses the students who live throughout Pierce County. The name was changed once more in 1986 to Pierce College.

In 1989, a new campus was built in Puyallup, just east of South Hill Mall. The school later opened in the fall of 1990. By 1999, the status was upgraded to a full-service college.

Academics
Pierce College offers three bachelor of applied science degrees and many associate degrees, mainly in the arts and sciences and leadership programs such as Multicultural Leaders Institution and Emerging Leaders Academy. There are also certificate programs in early childhood education, social services, dental hygienist, and others. Classes are held on the quarter system and the college is accredited by the Northwest Commission on Colleges and Universities.

Pierce College also partners with local school districts to offer Running Start credits for high school juniors and seniors. Successful students will earn dual-credit for both their high school degree requirements and those requirements for an Associates degree.

Athletics
The Pierce College Raiders Athletics Department competes in the Western Region of the Northwest Athletic Conference (NWAC). The Raiders currently field twelve teams and compete in men's and women's soccer, women's volleyball, men's and women's basketball, baseball, women's cross country, and fastpitch. Pierce Athletics also supports the cheerleading team.

Pierce College Puyallup
Pierce College's Puyallup campus at 1601 39th Avenue SE opened in 1990 with only one building, the Gaspard Education Center. The campus expanded in 1996 with the opening of the Brouillet Library Science Center, and the college was officially recognized by the State Board for Community and Technical Colleges as Washington's 34th community college in 1999. The campus expanded yet again in 2004 with the College Center building, in 2008 with the Health Education Center Puyallup, and in 2010 with the Arts and Allied Health Building.

Campus News

The Puyallup Post

The student newspaper of Pierce College Puyallup is The Puyallup Post, commonly referred to as The Post. It is published 12 times each school year during fall, winter, and spring quarters. The Post was founded in 1994 and was originally called The Puyallup Campus Post when it was an insert in Fort Steilacoom's The Pioneer.

It is staffed by Pierce College Puyallup students, an adviser, and a publication and graphics manager.

The Post features news, campus life, sports, features, commentary, reviews, and multimedia components. In addition to 12 print editions of 20 or more pages, The Puyallup Post produces regular content on its website and YouTube channel.

The Puyallup Post has won numerous awards, including:

 2010 WCCJA Second Place – Page Design
 2010 WCCJA Second Place – General Excellence
 2011 WCCJA Third Place – Best Website
 2011 WCCJA Honorable Mention – Photo Essay
 2016 Associated Collegiate Press Best of Show: Fifth Place – Publication Website, Small School
 2017 PNAJE Second Place – General Excellence
 2017 PNAJE First Place – Best Website Content

The Pioneer

The Pioneer is the student newspaper of Pierce College Fort Steilacoom. The Pioneer published a print newspaper during fall, winter, and spring quarters and also publishes to its website.

Notable alumni
Oscar Hilman
Dr. Tana Hasart (AAS 1985), former President of Clark College (Washington)
Demetrious Johnson (fighter), professional Mixed Martial Artist, first and only UFC Flyweight Champion
Joyce McDonald (attended 1980, 1997), politician
Megan Jendrick, Olympic gold medalist swimmer and author

References

External links
Official website

 
Universities and colleges in Tacoma, Washington
Lakewood, Washington
Universities and colleges accredited by the Northwest Commission on Colleges and Universities
Educational institutions established in 1967
Community colleges in Washington (state)
1967 establishments in Washington (state)